Senarica is a village in the Abruzzo region of central Italy. With a population of fewer than 300 people, it is a frazione of the comune of Crognaleto.

Geography
It lies west of Teramo city, in the province of Teramo.

See also
Republic of Cospaia
List of historic states of Italy
European microstates
List of republics

Notes and references

Notes

References

Senarica page at Flags of the World
Aldo Ziggotio, an article published on the Italian bulletin Armi Antiche, 1987

External links
 
  Senarica official website
 

Frazioni of the Province of Teramo
Italian states
States and territories established in 1343
States and territories disestablished in the 18th century
Former republics
Micronations in Italy